The 1972 New York Jets season was the 13th season for the team and the third in the National Football League. It began with the team trying to improve upon its 6–8 record from 1971 under head coach Weeb Ewbank. The Jets star quarterback Joe Namath was healthy for a full season for the first time in three years but the rest of the squad was decimated by injuries and, after a strong start, the Jets finished with a record of 7–7.

During the 1972 preseason, a squad composed of the Jets’ rookies defeated the Long Island Chiefs of the Seaboard Football League, 29–3.(In 1974, the Houston Oilers rookie squad played a preseason game vs the minor league San Antonio Toros) 

Namath threw for 496 yards and six touchdowns (on 15 of 28 passes) in a 44–34 victory over the Baltimore Colts in his first appearance at Baltimore’s Memorial Stadium in week two, but the next week, the Jets were humbled 26–20 by the Houston Oilers, the Oilers' only victory of 1972 and their last before embarking on an 18-game losing streak.

They Jets were eliminated from playoff contention in the season’s thirteenth week, a Monday Night Game with the Raiders in which a battered and bruised Namath threw for 403 yards and nearly pulled off the upset. After the game Raiders coach John Madden went into the Jets locker room and shook Namath’s hand out of respect; it was the only time in his coaching career Madden ever did that. Eliminated from postseason play, the Jets’ coaches decided Namath would sit out the final game of the season to make sure no serious injuries were incurred prior to the 1973 season.

Roster

Offseason

Schedule

Game summaries

Week 2: at Baltimore Colts 

 Source:
    
    
    
    
    
    
    
    
    
    
    
    
    

The rivalry between Joe Namath and Johnny Unitas had never resulted in both quarterbacks meeting for a full game until this meeting. Namath and Unitas exploded to a combined 872 passing yards. Namath threw for 496 yards and six touchdowns despite only 15 completions in 28 attempts. Unitas scored twice but was sacked six times. Don McCauley also scored twice for the Colts as the Jets won 44–34.

Standings

References

External links 
 1972 statistics

New York Jets seasons
New York Jets
New York Jets season
1970s in Queens